Olav Dominikusson Bjørkum (1859–1936) was a Norwegian politician for the Liberal Party.

He graduated from Stord Teachers College in 1879, and worked as a school teacher from 1880 to 1882 before turning to farming.

As a politician he was a member of Årdal municipality council, and served as mayor from 1899 to 1904. He served as a deputy representative to the Norwegian Parliament during the term 1900–1903.

References
Olav Bjørkum at NRK Sogn og Fjordane County Encyclopedia 

1859 births
1936 deaths
Deputy members of the Storting
Liberal Party (Norway) politicians
Mayors of places in Sogn og Fjordane